Hemihoplites is an extinct genus of ammonoid cephalopods belonging to the family Hemihoplitidae. These fast-moving nektonic carnivores  lived in the Cretaceous period, from Hauterivian age to Barremian age.

Description 

It is evolute, compressed. The Whorl section is rectangular. The ribs are simple or branching or long or short, well spaced, straight or slightly flexuous, crossing flat venter transversely, typically with distinct umbilical and ventrolateral tubercles.

Species

 Hemihoplites feraudianus (d'Orbigny, 1841)
 Hemihoplites mexicanus Imlay, 1940
 Hemihoplites ploszkiewiczi Riccardi and Aguirre Urreta, 1989
 Hemihoplites soulieri (Matheron, 1878)
 Hemihoplites varicostatus Riccardi and Aguirre Urreta, 1989

Distribution
Fossils of species within this genus have been found in the Cretaceous rocks of Antarctida (Alexander Island), Bulgaria, southeastern France, Mexico, Slovakia, South Africa and Trinidad and Tobago.

References

External links 
 

Cretaceous ammonites
Ammonites of Europe
Ammonitida genera
Ancyloceratoidea
Cretaceous France
Fossils of France
 Fossils of Antarctica
Ammonites of North America